The Hercules Class were four broad gauge steam locomotives for the Great Western Railway. They were the first 0-6-0 locomotives, being built in 1842 by Nasmyth, Gaskell and Company. They were all withdrawn in 1870 and 1871.

From about 1865, the Hercules Class locomotives became part of the Fury Class, along with the Premier Class locomotives.

Locomotives
 Goliah (1842 - 1871)
This locomotives was named after the Biblical giant, Goliah.
 Hercules (1842 - 1870)
This locomotive was named after the Greek mythological strongman, Hercules.
 Sampson (1842 - 1870)
This locomotive was named after the Biblical strongman, Sampson.
 Tityos (1842 - 1870)
This locomotive was named after Tityos, a giant in Greek mythology.

Accidents and incidents
One person was killed.

References

Sources

 
 

Hercules
Broad gauge (7 feet) railway locomotives
0-6-0 locomotives
Nasmyth, Wilson and Company locomotives
Railway locomotives introduced in 1842